The Party of Regions was a Polish non-parliamentary political party created in November 2007 and registered in February 2008. The Party of Regions was created by former members of Self-Defence after the parliamentary election in 2007, when Self-Defence support collapsed to far less than the 5% electoral threshold giving them no seats in the new legislature. For failure to disclose their financial records for the year 2015, they were struck off in early 2017.

See also
Politics of Poland
Self-Defense of the Republic of Poland
List of political parties in Poland

References

2007 establishments in Poland
2017 disestablishments in Poland
Agrarian parties in Poland
Defunct political parties in Poland
Eurosceptic parties in Poland
Left-wing nationalist parties
Libertas.eu
Nationalist parties in Poland
Polish nationalist parties
Political parties established in 2007
Political parties disestablished in 2017